Macx or variation, may refer to:

 MacX, a Macintosh implementation of X/11
 Macx Davies (born 1992) Canadian biathlete
 Manfred Macx, a fictional character from Charles Stross 2005 novel Accelerando
 Mac OS X, Apple Macintosh computer operating system

See also

Mach 10 (disambiguation)
Mac (disambiguation)
Max (disambiguation)
Macs (disambiguation)
MAKS (disambiguation)
machx, a mountain biking trail in Pantperthog
 Mach-X (Marvel Comics), comic book superhero alter-ego of Marvel Comics character Abner Jenkins
Mack 10, rapper Dedrick D'Mon Rolison
Mac-10, rapper Phillip Allen; see Totally Insane
MAC-10 submachine gun